Marcia Gay Harden (born August 14, 1959) is an American actress. She is the recipient of various accolades, including an Academy Award and a Tony Award, in addition to nominations for three Primetime Emmy Awards.

Born in the La Jolla area of San Diego, California, Harden began her acting career appearing in television programs throughout the 1980s. In 1986, she appeared in her first film role, with her breakthrough coming in the 1990 Coen brothers–directed Miller's Crossing. For her portrayal of artist Lee Krasner in the 2000 biographical film Pollock, she won the Academy Award for Best Supporting Actress. She received a second Academy Award nomination for her performance as Celeste Boyle in the drama film Mystic River (2003). Her other notable film credits include The First Wives Club (1996), Flubber (1997), Space Cowboys (2000), Mona Lisa Smile (2003), and the Fifty Shades film trilogy.

Harden made her Broadway debut in 1993, starring in Tony Kushner's epic play Angels in America: Millennium Approaches/Angels in America: Perestroika for which she was nominated for a Tony Award for Best Featured Actress in a Play. She returned to Broadway in 2009 as Veronica in Yazmina Reza's comedic play God of Carnage, with her performance earning her the Tony Award for Best Actress in a Play.

Harden's television credits include the HBO series The Newsroom, the CBS series Code Black, the ABC series How to Get Away with Murder, and the Apple TV+ series The Morning Show. She received her first Primetime Emmy Award nomination for her role as FBI Special Agent Dana Lewis in the crime drama series Law & Order: Special Victims Unit, and earned a second Primetime Emmy Award nomination for her performance as Janina Krzyżanowska in the television film The Courageous Heart of Irena Sendler (2009).

Early life 
Harden was born in the La Jolla area of San Diego, California, the daughter of Texas natives Beverly Harden (née Bushfield), a housewife, and Thad Harold Harden (1932–2002), who was an officer in the United States Navy. She has three sisters and one brother.

Harden's brother is named Thaddeus, as are her father and her former husband. Harden's family frequently moved because of her father's job, living in Japan, Germany, Greece, California, and Maryland.

Harden graduated from Surrattsville High School in Clinton, Maryland in 1976. She received a Bachelor of Arts in theater from the University of Texas at Austin in 1980. Harden received a Master of Fine Arts from New York University's Tisch School of the Arts in 1988.

Career
Harden's first film role was in a 1979 student-produced movie at the University of Texas. Throughout the 1980s, she appeared in several television programs, including Simon & Simon, Kojak, and CBS Summer Playhouse. She appeared in The Imagemaker (1986), her first movie screen role, in which she played a stage manager. She appeared in the Coen brothers' Miller's Crossing (1990), a 1930s mobster drama in which she first gained wide exposure. Even so, at the time, living in New York City, she had to go back to doing catering jobs "because I didn't have any money".

Harden debuted on Broadway in the role of Harper Pitt (and others) in Tony Kushner's Angels in America in 1993. The role earned her critical acclaim and she received a Tony Award nomination (Best Featured Actress in a Play).

Harden played actress Ava Gardner alongside Philip Casnoff as Frank Sinatra in the 1992 made-for-TV miniseries Sinatra. Throughout the 1990s, she continued to appear in films and television. Her notable film roles include the Disney sci-fi comedy Flubber (1997), a popular hit in which she co-starred with Robin Williams; the supernatural drama Meet Joe Black (1998), playing the under-appreciated daughter of a tycoon (Anthony Hopkins, co-starring Brad Pitt); Labor of Love (1998), a Lifetime television movie in which she starred with David Marshall Grant; and Space Cowboys (2000), an all-star adventure-drama about aging astronauts.

In 2000, Harden won the Academy Award for Best Supporting Actress for her portrayal of painter Lee Krasner in the biographical film Pollock. In 2004, she received a second Academy Award nomination for Best Supporting Actress for her performance in the mystery crime drama Mystic River.

Harden guest-starred as FBI undercover agent Dana Lewis posing as a white supremacist in "Raw", an episode of the popular crime drama Law & Order: Special Victims Unit. This role earned Harden her first Emmy Award nomination for best guest actress in a drama series in 2007. She reprised the role in the series' eighth-season premiere and again in the 12th-season episode "Penetration" as a rape victim.

Harden appeared in several 2007 films, including Sean Penn's Into the Wild and Frank Darabont's The Mist (opposite Thomas Jane and Laurie Holden), based on the novella by Stephen King. Also in 2007, she shared top billing with Kevin Bacon in Rails & Ties, the directorial debut of Alison Eastwood. Harden played a woman who has a mastectomy in Home (2008). (Her character in Rails & Ties also had a mastectomy.) Scenes in both films required her to bare her breasts, with the missing breast removed using computer-generated imagery. In Home, her co-stars include her daughter, Eulala Scheel. Harden starred in the Christmas Cottage, a story of the early artistic beginnings of the Painter of Light Thomas Kinkade.

Harden appeared as a regular on the FX series Damages as a shrewd corporate attorney opposite Glenn Close and William Hurt in 2009. She received a 2009 Emmy nomination for her role in The Courageous Heart of Irena Sendler, a TV film also starring Oscar-winner Anna Paquin. She was a Best Supporting Actress in a TV Movie/Miniseries nominee and lost to Shohreh Aghdashloo. If she had won this Emmy, Harden would have entered the elite group of "triple-crown" actors, those who have won the profession's three highest honors: the Academy Award (film), the Tony Award (stage), and the Emmy Award (television).

Harden co-starred with Elliot Page and Drew Barrymore in 2009's Whip It, which proved a critical success. She also appeared in the comedy The Maiden Heist (2009) with Christopher Walken and Morgan Freeman.

Harden returned to Broadway in Yasmina Reza's God of Carnage, co-starring with James Gandolfini, Hope Davis and Jeff Daniels, in 2009. All three actors were nominated for a Tony Award; Harden won Best Actress in a Play.

Harden reunited with her former Broadway co-star Jeff Daniels as a new cast member on HBO's series The Newsroom in 2013. She played Christian Grey's mother, Grace Trevelyan Grey, in the Fifty Shades film series from 2015 to 2018. Also in 2015, she began a starring role in the TV series Code Black. She stars in the 2022 CBS drama So Help Me Todd, since renewed for a second season.

Personal life
In 1996 Harden married Thaddaeus Scheel, a prop master, with whom she worked on The Spitfire Grill. They have three children: a daughter, Eulala Grace Scheel (born September 1998), and twins Julitta Dee Scheel and Hudson Harden Scheel (born April 22, 2004). In February 2012, Harden filed for divorce from Scheel.

Harden has owned a property in the Catskills and a townhouse in Harlem. She sold the Harlem townhouse in 2012.

Harden is an avid potter, which she learned in high school, and then took up again while acting in Angels in America.

Harden is a practitioner of ikebana, the art of Japanese flower arrangement, which her mother learned while they lived in Japan. She gave a brief demonstration in 2007 on The Martha Stewart Show and presented some works of her family, as well. In May 2018, a memoir called The Seasons of My Mother: A Memoir of Love, Family, and Flowers was published. The book details the story and bond of mother and daughter throughout time and how they are dealing with the largest struggle yet, her mother's Alzheimer's disease. Harden created works of ikebana specifically for this book to illustrate the different seasons of her mother's life.

Acting credits

Film

Television

Theater

Awards and nominations

Bibliography

References

External links

 
 
 
 Marcia Gay Harden at Internet Off-Broadway Database
 
 Marcia Gay Harden 2006 Interview on Sidewalks Entertainment

1959 births
20th-century American actresses
21st-century American actresses
Actresses from San Diego
American expatriates in Germany
American expatriates in Greece
American expatriates in Japan
American film actresses
American Shakespearean actresses
American stage actresses
American television actresses
American voice actresses
Audiobook narrators
Best Supporting Actress Academy Award winners
Kadōka
Living people
People from La Jolla, San Diego
Tisch School of the Arts alumni
Tony Award winners
University of Texas at Austin College of Fine Arts alumni